The wax argument or the ball of wax example is a thought experiment that René Descartes created in the second of his Meditations on First Philosophy. He devised it to analyze what properties are essential for bodies, show how uncertain our knowledge of the world is compared to our knowledge of our minds, and argue for rationalism.

The thought experiment
Descartes first considers all the sensible properties of a ball of wax such as its shape, texture, size, color, and smell. He then points out that all these properties change as the wax is moved closer to a fire. The only properties that necessarily remain are extension, changeability and movability:

These properties are however not directly perceived through the senses or imagination (the wax can be extended and moved in more ways than can be imagined). Instead to grasp the essence of the wax, it must be done through pure reason:

See also 
 Object permanence
 Ship of Theseus

References

 

Concepts in epistemology
Philosophical arguments
Rationalism
René Descartes
Thought experiments in philosophy